Sebastian Ottosson (born February 7, 1992) is a Swedish professional ice hockey player. He is currently playing in Sweden's Division 1 with Kallinge/Ronneby.

Ottosson made his Elitserien debut playing with Linköpings HC during the 2009–10 Elitserien season.

In 2017 he played for Melbourne Ice in the Australian Ice Hockey League (AIHL), winning the Goodall Cup.

References

External links

1992 births
Living people
Linköping HC players
Swedish ice hockey forwards
People from Karlskrona
Sportspeople from Blekinge County